Karel Hradil may refer to:

Karel Hradil (canoeist) (born 1937), Czechoslovak sprint canoeist
Karel Hradil (triple jumper) (born 1953), Czechoslovak triple jumper